High Heels is the debut Japanese extended play (fourth overall) by the South Korean girl group CLC. It was released on April 13, 2016 by Cube Entertainment (Japan). "High Heels" was release as the lead single.

Background and promotion
On March 4, Cube Entertainment announced that CLC will be making their Japanese debut on April 13, starting with their overseas promotion. The mini-album includes the Japanese versions of previously released songs, "Pepe", "Curious", "First Love" and their promotional single "High Heels". The album also includes an exclusive cover of Kylie Minogue's song, "I Should Be So Lucky". The group held their 1st Japanese showcase with only 6-members as member Eunbin (former Produce 101 contestant) was reported to be not participating in the group's Japanese promotions.

Editions
The mini-album is available in two different editions, including: Type A (CD) and Type B (CD+DVD) version.

Track listing

Charts

References

External links
 

2016 EPs
Japanese-language EPs
Cube Entertainment EPs
CLC (group) EPs